Anna Karina (born Hanne Karin Blarke Bayer; 22 September 1940 – 14 December 2019) was a Danish-French film avant garde actress, director, writer, and singer. She was French New Wave director Jean-Luc Godard's collaborator in the 1960s, performing in several of his films, including The Little Soldier, A Woman Is a Woman, My Life to Live,  (Band of Outsiders),  (Crazy Pete) and Alphaville. For her performance in A Woman Is a Woman, Karina won the Silver Bear Award for Best Actress at the Berlin Film Festival.

In 1972, Karina set up a production company for Vivre ensemble (1973), her directorial debut, which screened in the Critics' Week lineup at the 26th Cannes Film Festival. She also directed the French-Canadian film Victoria (2008). In addition to her work in cinema, she worked as a singer and wrote several novels.

Karina was an icon of 1960s cinema, and referred to as the "effervescent free spirit of the French New Wave, with all of the scars that the position entails". The New York Times described her as "one of the screen's great beauties and an enduring symbol of the French New Wave."

Early life 
Hanne Karin Blarke Bayer was born on 22 September 1940 in Frederiksberg, Denmark. Her mother was a dress shop owner and her father was a ship captain who left the family a year after she was born.

She lived with her maternal grandparents for four years, then spent the next four years in foster care before returning to live with her mother and her abusive step-father when she was eight. As a child, her mother told her that she was ugly, and that her eyes and forehead were too big. She has described her childhood as "terribly wanting to be loved", as she felt unwanted and unloved. She made numerous attempts to run away from home, trying to find boats that would take her to Sweden or America. She dreamt of becoming an actor from a young age and wanted to attend drama school but at the time the age requirement for Danish drama schools was 21.

As a student, she rarely attended school and when she achieved good grades in her certificate exams, her school refused to believe she had done so without cheating. The injustice made her leave school at the age of 14.

Career

Beginnings and modeling 
After leaving school, she went on to find work as a lift operator in a department store and as an assistant to an illustrator.

She began her professional career in Denmark, where she sang in cabarets and worked as a model playing in commercials. Aged 14, she was spotted in the street by Ib Schmedes, who cast her as the lead in his forty-minute short film Pigin og skoene (1959, The Girl and The Shoes), which won a prize at Cannes. However, as things didn't seem to be going well at home, where in an evening her step-father beat her very badly, she decided to leave. With the equivalent of $15, which she'd received from her grandfather, she hitchhiked to Paris. She has said that although she grew up in Denmark, she was “fascinated” by France and after traveling to Paris at age 14, she wanted to go back and live there.

In the summer of 1958, aged 17, Karina arrived in Paris. With only 10,000 francs and unable to speak French, she struggled to find a place to stay and had to ask neighborhood priests for somewhere to sleep. Finally, a young priest found her a small room on the rue Pavée, just behind the Bastille. One day, while starving and wandering through Paris, she found herself in Saint-Germain-des-Prés. She sat down at Les Deux Magots café, where a woman called Catherine Harlé approached her and asked her if she would be willing to do some photos. Suspicious at first, Karina finally agreed when she found out it was a professional shoot for the French newspaper Jours de France. After finishing the shoot, Harlé, although telling Karina that she wasn't very talented, gave her some contacts.

She began to work as a model and eventually became successful, posing for several magazines, including Elle, and meeting Pierre Cardin and Coco Chanel. Karina has said that when she met Chanel on the set of the Elle photoshoot, Chanel told her: “I believe you want to be an actress… You need to learn French. What’s your name little girl?” “Hanne Karin Bayer.” Karina replied. And Chanel said: “No: Anna Karina – call yourself that.” It was deliberately coined to evoke Leo Tolstoy's novel Anna Karenina. She also appeared in commercials for products such as Coca-Cola, Pepsodent, and Palmolive. She was still underage but received enough money to find herself a place to stay. And as she still wanted to attend drama school, she sat in movie theaters and watched French movies to teach herself the language.

Film 
Jean-Luc Godard, then a film critic for Cahiers du cinéma, first saw Karina in the Palmolive adverts in which she posed in bathtubs, during movie previews in a Monsavon pub. He was casting his debut feature film Breathless (À bout de souffle, 1960), and offered her a small part in it, but she refused when he mentioned that there would be a nude scene. When Godard questioned her refusal, mentioning her apparent nudity in the Palmolive ads, she is said to have replied, "Are you mad? I was wearing a bathing suit in those ads—the soapsuds went up to my neck. It was in your mind that I was undressed." In the end, the character Godard reserved for Karina did not appear in the film. Godard offered her a role in The Little Soldier (not released until 1963) which concerns contentious French actions during the Algerian War. She played a pro-Algerian activist. Karina, then still under 21, had to persuade her estranged mother to sign the contract for her. The film was immediately controversial, outlawed from French theaters for its content referencing the Algerian War.

As Angela in A Woman Is a Woman (Une femme est une femme, 1961), Karina's role was as an unattached striptease dancer who nevertheless wishes to have a child and daydreams about appearing in MGM musicals. Her school-girl costume emulated Leslie Caron in Gigi (1958), worn even while performing her act. Karina won the Silver Bear for Best Actress at the 11th Berlin International Film Festival for her performance. In all, Karina appeared in eight films directed by Godard, including My Life to Live (1962), Band of Outsiders (1964)  and Alphaville (both 1965). In , Karina's character is on the run with her ex-boyfriend, while in Alphaville, a science-fiction film often equated to Bladerunner, Karina's role requires her to have difficulty saying the phrase "I love you." The last film in the sequence was Made in USA (1966). Anne Billson, in an article querying the concept of the female muse, wrote that Godard in his films with Karina "seems to have trouble conceiving that the female experience revolves around anything other than prostitution, duplicity, or wanting babies." Karina herself did not object to being described as Godard's muse: "Maybe it's too much, it sounds so pompous. But of course I’m always very touched to hear people say that. Because Jean-Luc gave me a gift to play all of those parts."

Her career flourished, with Karina appearing in dozens of films through the 1960s, including: The Nun (La Religieuse, 1966), directed by Jacques Rivette; Luchino Visconti's The Stranger (Lo straniero, 1967); the George Cukor/Joseph Strick collaboration Justine (1969); and Tony Richardson's Laughter in the Dark (1969). She continued to work steadily into the 1970s, with roles in Christian de Chalonge's The Wedding Ring (L'Alliance, 1971), Andre Delvaux's Rendezvous at Bray (Rendez-vous à Bray, also 1971), The Salzburg Connection (1972), and Franco Brusati's Bread and Chocolate (Pane e cioccolata, 1973).

In 1972, she set up the production company for Living Together (Vivre ensemble, 1973), her directorial debut, in which she also acted. The film screened in the Critics’ Week lineup at the 26th Cannes Film Festival.

She starred in Rainer Werner Fassbinder's Chinese Roulette (Chinesisches Roulette, 1976); Fassbinder allegedly wrote the film for her and Ulli Lommel, her partner at the time. She later wrote and acted in Last Song (1987) and appeared in Up, Down, Fragile (Haut bas fragile, 1995), directed by Jacques Rivette, and sang in The Truth About Charlie (2002), a remake of the film Charade (1963).

Karina wrote, directed and starred in Victoria (2008), a musical road movie filmed in Montreal and Saguenay–Lac-Saint-Jean, Quebec. The lead character, played by Karina, has amnesia. Richard Kuipers praised it in Variety as "a pleasant gambol through the backwoods of Quebec."

Music and writing 
Karina maintained a singing career. At the end of the 1960s, she scored a major hit with "Sous le soleil exactement" and "Roller Girl" by Serge Gainsbourg. Both songs are from the TV musical comedy Anna (1967), by the film director Pierre Koralnik, in which she sings seven songs alongside Gainsbourg and Jean-Claude Brialy. Karina recorded the album  with Philippe Katerine, followed by a concert tour. In 2005, she released Chansons de films, a collection of songs sung in movies.

Karina wrote four novels:  (1973), Golden City (1983),  (1988), and Jusqu'au bout du hasard (1998).

Personal life 

They began a relationship and married in 1961. Karina liked being the muse, stating in 2016: "How could I not be honoured? Maybe it's too much, it sounds so pompous. But of course I’m always very touched to hear people say that. Because Jean-Luc gave me a gift to play all of those parts. It was like Pygmalion, you know? I was Eliza Doolittle and he was the teacher." The couple became, according to The Independent, "one of the most celebrated pairings of the 1960s." A writer for Filmmaker magazine called their work "arguably the most influential body of work in the history of cinema." Despite the critical success, their relationship behind the scenes was described as tumultuous; they fought on film sets, she fell ill several times, attempted suicide and was subsequently hospitalized in a mental health institution. Godard was often absent without explanation. He was also very jealous, questioned Karina's acting ability and told her: “How are you going to say these lines? They’re so terrible! It’s a comedy, you are never going to be able to do that.” One Godard film from this period which does not feature Karina, Contempt (1963), is said to be based on their difficult relationship. The couple divorced in 1965.

Karina said in spring 2016 that she and Godard no longer spoke to each other. She described the relationship in an interview with W magazine:It was all very exciting from the beginning. Of course we have a great love story and all that, but we were so different. He was 10 years older than me. He was very strange. He would go away and come back three weeks later...It was difficult, and I was a young girl, not even 21—at the time Godard was 30. I know he didn't mean to hurt me, but he did. He was never there, he was never coming back, and I never knew where he was. He drove me a bit crazy.After divorcing Godard, Karina remarried three times; she was married to French actors Pierre Fabre from 1968 to 1974 and Daniel Duval from 1978 to 1981, and to American film director Dennis Berry from 1982 until her death.

Karina died at the age of 79 on Saturday, 14 December 2019, at a hospital in Paris. According to her agent, Laurent Balandras, the cause of death was cancer. However, her husband Dennis Berry said that the cause was not cancer, but a complication following a muscular rupture.

Legacy 
Karina is regularly considered an icon of 1960s cinema, a staple in French New Wave cinema, as well as a style icon. The Guardian described her as an "effervescent free spirit of the French new wave." The New York Times described her style as looking like a schoolgirl in her acting roles, regardless of whether she was playing a streetwalker or a terrorist. Her signature look was her dark hair, wispy bangs, heavy eyeliner and school uniform of primary-coloured sailor-uniform tops, knee socks, plaid headwear such as berets and boaters. Refinery29 wrote that "her 60s French girl style – think sailor dresses, tartan, long socks, and hats – and mesmerizing doe-eyed beauty mean she continues to be referenced today by the super-stylish."

Filmography

References

External links 

 
 
 Anna Karina at Yahoo! Movies
 Anna Karina biography on newwavefilm.com
 Anna Karina fan site

1940 births
2019 deaths
People from Frederiksberg Municipality
20th-century Danish novelists
20th-century Danish women writers
20th-century French actresses
20th-century French women writers
21st-century Danish actresses
21st-century Danish screenwriters
21st-century French actresses
21st-century French screenwriters
Bodil Honorary Award recipients
Burials at Père Lachaise Cemetery
Chevaliers of the Légion d'honneur
Commandeurs of the Ordre des Arts et des Lettres
Danish emigrants to France
Danish female models
20th-century Danish women singers
Danish film actresses
Danish film directors
Danish stage actresses
Danish women novelists
Danish women screenwriters
Deaths from cancer in France
French female models
French women pop singers
French film actresses
French film directors
French screenwriters
French stage actresses
French women film directors
French women novelists
French women screenwriters
Naturalized citizens of France
Silver Bear for Best Actress winners